Omar Anwar (born 1 July 1983) is a former English cricketer who played for Oxford UCCE. He was born in Harrow.

He made his first appearance for the team against Middesex in 2003, scoring 99 in his first innings, which would remain his first-class best for the entirety of his career. He made two further first-class appearances during 2003, and two appearances for Middlesex Second XI at the end of the University year.

Anwar continued to appear for Oxford University until 2006, playing for Stanmore in the Cockspur Cup for the first time in 2005.

References 

1983 births
Living people
People from Harrow, London
Alumni of Oxford Brookes University
English cricketers
British Asian cricketers
Oxford MCCU cricketers
British Universities cricketers